Mulliner Park Ward was a bespoke coachbuilder in Hythe Road, Willesden, London UK.

Mulliner now is the personal commissioning department for Bentley.

Mulliner Park Ward was a subsidiary of Rolls-Royce and made bespoke bodies in London for Rolls-Royce and Bentley motor cars. The coachbuilding business closed in 1991 but the Mulliner name is used for the personal commissioning department of the current Bentley manufacturer.

History 
Rolls-Royce Limited formed Mulliner Park Ward by the 1961 merger of two Rolls-Royce subsidiaries: Park Ward of Willesden, London, a Rolls-Royce subsidiary since 1939 and H. J. Mulliner & Co. of Chiswick, a Rolls-Royce subsidiary since 1959.

References

External links

Rolls-Royce Coachbuilder: Mulliner Park Ward
Mulliner Park Ward, in the Rolls-Royce Wiki

Coachbuilders of the United Kingdom
Vehicle manufacture in London
Bentley
Rolls-Royce